Kwabena Yeboah (born  1967) at Apam in the Central Region of Ghana, is a Ghanaian veteran sports journalist, writer and commentator. He is known for hosting sports talk shows, weekly sports reviews and live commentary on GTV. The expression Oluwaa is attributed to Kwabena for his reaction to goals during commentaries.

Career 
Kwabena has hosted popular show Sports Highlights on GTV since 21 February 1994. He served as the Vice President of the Sports Writers Association of Ghana (SWAG) and was elevated to the role of President in 2015 after he won the elections. In 2019, he was reelected and given the nod for a second tenure of 4 years. He was also appointed as board member of Ghana Airports Company.

References 

Living people
Ghanaian sports journalists
1967 births
Ghanaian sportswriters
Ghanaian television journalists